The Menefee Formation is a lower Campanian geologic formation found in Colorado and New Mexico, United States.

Description
The Menefee Formation consists of fluvial sandstone, shale, and coal. Based on ammonite biostratigraphy, the age of the Menefee Formation can be constrained to 84.2-79 million years (Ma), based on the presence of Baculites perplexus in the overlying Cliff House Sandstone, and ammonites from the late Santonian in the underlying Point Lookout Sandstone.

Named members include a lower Cleary Coal Member and an upper Allison Member.

The Mesaverde Group in the San Juan Basin records a marine regression-transgression sequence of the western margin of the Western Interior Seaway. The Menefee Formation was deposited at the peak of the regression as coastal river delta and swamp sediments, and includes numerous coal beds.

The formation is exposed at Chaco Canyon National Park, where many of the coal beds have been burned to produce distinctive red cinder outcrops.

Fossils
The Menefee Formation includes fossils of turtles, fish and crocodiles and fragmentary evidence of hadrosaurs, ankylosaurs, and ceratopsian dinosaurs. Plant fossils include leaf impressions of palms, conifers, laurels, witchhazel, and camellia. The flora are suggestive of a moist subtropical environment.

Vertebrate fauna 
Several vertebrates have been recovered from the Menefee Formation, including intermediate remains of baenids, trionychids, and dromaeosaurids.

Economic geology
The Menefee Formation has been extensively mined for coal since the early 20th century. The Monero field in Rio Arriba County, New Mexico, was mined from the 1880s into the early 1920s to support the Denver and Rio Grande Western Railroad, but while the coal is of good quality, the coal beds are relatively thin and the terrain is rugged. Remaining reserves are around 13.5 million tons, inadequate for economic exploitation in the 21st century.

History of investigation
The Menefee Formation was first described by W.H.Holmes in 1877 during the Hayden Survey as the "Middle Coal Group" of the Mesaverde Formation. A.J. Collier redesignated this unit in 1919 as the Menefee Formation and raised the Mesaverde Formation to group rank.

See also 
 List of dinosaur-bearing rock formations
 List of stratigraphic units with few dinosaur genera

References

Bibliography 
 
 
 
 
 
 
 
 
 
 
 
 
 
 
 

Geologic formations of the United States
Cretaceous formations of New Mexico
Campanian Stage